The following is a list of Wikipedia articles relating to  virtual printer software:

Free software
The following are distributed under free software licences:
CC PDF Converter (discontinued) – A Ghostscript-based virtual printer, provided by CogniView.
cups-pdf – An open source Ghostscript-based virtual printer that can be shared with Windows users over the LAN.  CUPS
Ghostscript – A command-line library for creation of PostScript and PDF files.
RedMon – Redirects a special printer port to the standard input of another program.
clawPDF – a fork of the last open-source version of PDFcreator
PdfScribe – based on Ghostscript, Redmon and the Microsoft Postscript driver

Freeware
The following are proprietary software but free of charge:
 Microsoft XPS Document Writer – A virtual printer for Microsoft Windows that creates an XPS (*.xps, *.oxps) document file from the print output of an application.

Virtual PDF printers
Virtual PDF printers for Microsoft Windows:
 Bullzip PDF Printer – there is a free version
 CutePDF
 DoPDF – this is a simplified version of NovaPDF
 PDFCreator – a Ghostscript-based virtual printer for Microsoft Windows, with user interface for advanced options (security settings, combining multiple documents, etc.).
 PrimoPDF
 PDF24 Creator – a free virtual PDF printer for Microsoft Windows, with user interface and additional tools like merging, splitting, compressing and assembling PDF files.

Commercial
Adobe Acrobat – Adobe System's commercial PDF authoring suite includes Adobe Distiller, a virtual printer for converting documents to PDF files. Adobe Distiller is not included with the free-to-use Adobe Reader product.

Virtual printers
Virtual printers for Microsoft Windows:
Microsoft Office Document Image Writer – Included in Microsoft Office Professional allowing documents to be saved in TIFF or Microsoft Document Imaging Format.  MODI is only supported in 32 bit Windows' versions.
Universal Document Converter – Creating PDF, JPEG, TIFF, PNG, GIF, PCX, DCX and BMP files. Free version adds watermark.

Notes 
1.This software has risk of installing potentially unwanted programs. For more information, refer to its main article.

Virtual printer software
Computer printers